Jane Duncan is an academic, public intellectual and activist at the Journalism  Department at the University of Johannesburg in South Africa.

She works on media freedom issues and is the former director of the Freedom of Expression Institute in Johannesburg.

Publications 

 co-edited with Mandla Seleoane
  to be published in October 2014

Notes and references

External links 
 Staff profile at the University of Johannesburg
 Staff profile at Rhodes University
 

Academic staff of the University of Johannesburg
Year of birth missing (living people)
Living people
South African women activists
South African women academics